Vincent Dufour (born 24 May 1968 in Longjumeau) is a French former football player who is now a manager.

Despite having a very ordinary playing career, Dufour has managed former Belgian Pro League side K.S.K. Beveren as well as then French Ligue 2 outfit Chamois Niortais. He has, however, been unemployed since being sacked by Beveren in 2006.

References

1969 births
Living people
French footballers
Association football midfielders
French football managers
Stade Rennais F.C. players
ES Viry-Châtillon players
Chamois Niortais F.C. managers
K.S.K. Beveren managers
People from Longjumeau
Footballers from Essonne